Andrew Hope III (December 23, 1949 – August 7, 2008) was a Tlingit Native rights activist and educator.  He was born and died in Sitka, Alaska. He was a co-founder of the Tlingit Clan Conference.

Published works
Lingit At.oowoo
Raven's Bones
 Will the Time Ever Come?

References

1949 births
2008 deaths
20th-century Native Americans
21st-century Native Americans
Alaska Native activists
Native American writers
People from Sitka, Alaska
Tlingit people
Writers from Alaska